The 1954 Davis Cup was the 43rd edition of the Davis Cup, the most important tournament between national teams in men's tennis. 23 teams entered the Europe Zone and 7 teams entered the America Zone. The Eastern Zone was abandoned for this year and India, the sole competing country, was moved to the Europe Zone.

The United States defeated Mexico in the America Zone final, and Sweden defeated France in the Europe Zone final. The United States defeated Sweden in the Inter-Zonal Final, and then defeated the defending champions Australia in the Challenge Round, ending Australia's four-year championship run. The final was played at White City Stadium in Sydney, Australia on 27–29 December.

America Zone

Draw

Final
Mexico vs. United States

Europe Zone

Draw

Final
France vs. Sweden

Inter-Zonal Final
United States vs. Sweden

Challenge Round
Australia vs. United States

References

External links
Davis Cup official website

 
Davis Cups by year
Davis Cup
Davis Cup
Davis Cup
Davis Cup